German submarine U-190 was a Type IXC/40 U-boat of Nazi Germany's Kriegsmarine built for service during World War II.

Her keel was laid down on 7 October 1941 by DeSchiMAG AG Weser of Bremen. She was launched on 8 June 1942 and commissioned on 24 September 1942 with Kapitänleutnant Max Wintermeyer in command.

She carried out a total of six war patrols during which she sank two ships. On 6 July 1944 Wintermeyer was relieved by Oberleutnant zur See Hans-Erwin Reith who commanded the boat for the rest of her career in the Kriegsmarine.

After VE Day, she was surrendered to the Royal Canadian Navy, in which she served for two more years as HMCS U-190.

Design
German Type IXC/40 submarines were slightly larger than the original Type IXCs. U-190 had a displacement of  when at the surface and  while submerged. She had two shafts and two  propellers.

U-190 was fitted with six  torpedo tubes (four fitted at the bow and two at the stern), 22 torpedoes, one  SK C/32 naval gun, 180 rounds, and a  SK C/30 as well as a  C/30 anti-aircraft gun. The boat had a complement of forty-eight.

Armament

FLAK weaponry
U-190 was mounted with two 2cm Flak C38 in a M 43U Zwilling mount with short folding shield on the upper Wintergarten. The M 43U mount was used on a number of U-boats (and ).

Service history

U-190 conducted six war patrols, sinking two ships with a total of 7,015 GRT and 590 tons. The first was the 7,015 GRT British cargo ship Empire Lakeland, sunk off Rockall on 8 March 1943, one week into U-190s first operation. The next four patrols were unsuccessful.

Attack on William H. Webb
On 13 June 1943, U-190 attacked a convoy off the east coast of the United States, east of New York. The Liberty Ship William H. Webb was in the most dangerous convoy position (tail ship, outside starboard column), when U-190 fired a torpedo at the vessel, but the Liberty Ship was equipped with a special anti-torpedo mine, which detonated the torpedo 200 feet away from the ship, causing minor damage. The captain of U-190 would report to U-boat HQ in Germany that he had fired a torpedo, and that the ship had detonated the torpedo and proceeded apparently unhurt.

U-190s final war patrol began on 22 February 1945. She left Norway equipped with six contact and eight T-5 "GNAT" acoustic torpedoes. Her mission was to interdict Allied shipping off Sable Island and in the approaches to Halifax, Nova Scotia harbour. On 16 April she was keeping station off the Sambro light ship when her crew heard ASDIC (Sonar) pinging.

Sinking of HMCS Esquimalt
The minesweeper  was conducting a routine patrol of the harbour. She was employing none of the mandatory anti-submarine precautions: she was not zig-zagging; she had not streamed her towed Foxer-type decoy, designed as a countermeasure against GNAT torpedoes; she had turned off her radar. Nonetheless, the U-boat crew was sure that they had been detected, and when Esquimalt turned toward them, U-190 turned to run and fired one GNAT from a stern tube.

The torpedo struck Esquimalts starboard side. She sank within four minutes, the last Canadian vessel to be lost due to enemy action in World War II. While eight of her crew went down with her, the remainder survived the immediate disaster. Esquimalt sank so rapidly, however, that no distress signals were sent, and no one knew of the sinking until some eight hours later when  discovered the survivors. During the delay 44 crewmen had died of exposure, leaving only 26.

Surrender and the tour
U-190 escaped the area and remained on patrol off the North American east coast until she received Reichspräsident Karl Dönitz's 8 May order to surrender. Reith signed a document of unconditional surrender, and was taken prisoner with his crew aboard Victoriaville which escorted the submarine to Newfoundland. With the white ensign flying from her masthead, U-190 sailed under the command of Lieutenant F. S. Burbidge into Bay Bulls, Newfoundland, on 14 May. The prisoners were taken to Halifax.

U-190 was formally commissioned into the Royal Canadian Navy on 19 May. Her first assignment, in the summer of 1945, was a ceremonial tour of communities along the St. Lawrence River and Gulf of St. Lawrence, with stops in Montreal, Trois-Rivières, Quebec City, Gaspé, Pictou, and Sydney. On returning to Halifax she assumed duties as an anti-submarine training vessel, which she continued to fulfill for a year and a half.

Operation Scuttled
U-190 was paid off on 24 July 1947, but had one last mission to complete.

The official purpose of "Operation Scuttled" was to provide training for inexperienced post-war recruits in the art of combined operations. U-190, painted in lurid red and yellow stripes, was towed to the spot where she had sunk Esquimalt, and at precisely 11:00 hours on Trafalgar Day 1947, the fireworks began. The "exercise" called for a deliberately escalating firepower demonstration, beginning with airborne rockets and culminating in a destroyer bombardment with 4.7-inch guns and a hedgehog anti-submarine weapon providing the coup de grace.

The first rocket attack struck home, and almost before the destroyers had a chance to train their guns, the U-boat was on the bottom of the ocean less than twenty minutes after the commencement of "Operation Scuttled."

Periscope and search
Before U-190 was sunk, her periscope had been salvaged. In 1963 it was installed at the Crow's Nest Officers Club in St. John's, Newfoundland. Many years of exposure to the weather damaged it to the point of uselessness, but it was overhauled and repaired; in a ceremony on 22 October 1998 it was "recommissioned" and is once again looking out at Water Street from the club. Original shipment of the periscope had been effected by Commodore Edward N. "Cookie" Clarke from HMC Dockyard, Halifax, where it had been in storage, to the Crow's Nest where Cookie had been a member during the war.
U-190 suffered no casualties from her crews during her career.

An 18 January 2006 article in the Edmonton Journal reported that a team of divers planned to search for U-190 and another U-boat, .

Summary of raiding history

See also
 
 List of ships of the Canadian Navy

References

Notes

Citations

Bibliography

External links

German Type IX submarines
U-boats commissioned in 1942
World War II submarines of Germany
1942 ships
Ships built in Bremen (state)
Submarines of the Royal Canadian Navy
Ships sunk as targets
Maritime incidents in 1947
Shipwrecks in the Atlantic Ocean